Dark Empire was a power metal, progressive death metal and thrash metal band.

History
Dark Empire was created in the winter of early 2004 by Verona, New Jersey–based guitarist Matt Moliti.

In early 2005, the recording of their debut album, Distant Tides, commenced. Distant Tides was released on April 25, 2006, and received rave reviews from specialized publications. The album was picked up for its first official label release by Rock Machine Records in Brazil, and was remastered by renowned Finnish engineer Mikka Jussila (Children of Bodom, Stratovarius,  Nightwish, etc.). Their second album, Humanity Dethroned, commenced recording in early 2008 and was released on May 5 of that year.

Dark Empire disbanded in July 2013.

Music

Dark Empire plays a mix of power metal, progressive metal and thrash metal.

Band members

Final members
 Derrick Schneider – lead vocals (2013)
 Matt Moliti – guitars, growls (2004–2013)
 Randy Knecht – bass guitar (2008–2013)
 Matt Graff – drums (2010–2013)
 Christian Colabelli – guitar (2012–2013)
 Harris Bergsohn – keyboards, acoustic guitar (2012–2013)

Session musicians
 Marc Ferreira – bass guitar, backing vocals (live) (2007)
 Omar Davila – drums (live) (2008)
 Brian Larkin – vocals (live) (2008)

Former members
 Brian Larkin – lead vocals (2011–2013)
 Urban Breed – vocals (a few months in 2010)
 Andrew Atwood – guitar (2007–2010)
 Jens Carlsson – vocals (2004–2009)
 Samus – drums (2006–2008)
 Teemu Tahkanen – drums (2004–2006)
 Noah Martin – bass guitar (2004–2006)

Discography
Studio albums
 Distant Tides (2006)
 Humanity Dethroned (2008)
 From Refuge to Ruin (2012)

Singles
 "Northern Sky" (2006)

References

External links
 Official Facebook
 Official Myspace Page

Heavy metal musical groups from New Jersey
Musical groups established in 2004
American power metal musical groups
American progressive metal musical groups
American thrash metal musical groups